Bogdan Planić (born 19 January 1992) is a Serbian professional footballer who plays as a defender at Shabab Al Ahli.

Club career
Born in Titovo Užice, Planić started out at Zlatibor Čajetina in the Drina Zone League, before transferring to Serbian SuperLiga club Sloboda Užice in the 2011 winter transfer window. He subsequently switched to Serbian League Belgrade side Žarkovo the following winter. In the summer of 2012, Planić returned to his hometown and joined Serbian First League club Jedinstvo Užice.

While playing for OFK Beograd, Planić was named in the Serbian SuperLiga Team of the Season for the 2013–14 season, securing him a transfer to Red Star Belgrade in July 2014. He, however, returned to OFK Beograd after just six months. In July 2016, Planić signed a two-and-a-half-year contract with Vojvodina. He earned his second selection in the league's best eleven in the 2016–17 season.

In August 2017, after much negotiation, Planić moved abroad to Romanian club, FCSB, where he became one of the most respected players in the squad, sometimes being appointed as captain.

On 6 September 2020 Planić joined Israeli club Maccabi Haifa FC, signing a 2-year contract. He made his debut for the club in the UEFA Europa League qualifiers match against Kairat Almaty, which ended in a 2–1 victory. He made his league debut in the 2–2 draw against Maccabi Tel Aviv. He scored his first goal for the club on 22 December 2020 in a league match against Bnei Yehuda which ended in a 2–1 victory. Planić quickly became a key player, and helped the club the win 2020–21 Israeli Premier League championship after 10 years.
In the 2020–21 season Planić and the club won their second championship in a row as well as the Toto Cup and the Israel super cup.
On 24 August 2022, Planić and Maccabi Haifa qualified to UEFA Champions League group stage for the 3rd time in the club's history, after beating Red Star Belgrade, Planić's former club, in the play-offs.

On 26 August 2022, just days after Maccabi Haifa's qualification to UEFA Champions League, Planić signed a 3-year contract at Shabab Al Ahli.

International career
In May 2014, Planić was capped twice for Serbia U21, appearing as a substitute in friendly matches against Israel and Austria.

Career statistics

Honours

Club 
FCSB
 Cupa României: 2019–20

Maccabi Haifa
 Israeli Premier League: 2020–21, 2021–22
 Toto Cup: 2021–22
 Israel Super Cup: 2021

Individual
 Serbian SuperLiga Team of the Season: 2013–14, 2016–17
 Liga I Team of the Season: 2017–18

References

External links
 
 
 
 

1992 births
Living people
Serbian footballers
FK Sloboda Užice players
OFK Žarkovo players
FK Jedinstvo Užice players
OFK Beograd players
Red Star Belgrade footballers
FK Vojvodina players
FC Steaua București players
Maccabi Haifa F.C. players
Serbian First League players
Serbian SuperLiga players
Liga I players
Israeli Premier League players
Serbia under-21 international footballers
Serbian expatriate footballers
Expatriate footballers in Romania
Expatriate footballers in Israel
Expatriate footballers in the United Arab Emirates
Serbian expatriate sportspeople in Romania
Serbian expatriate sportspeople in Israel
Serbian expatriate sportspeople in the United Arab Emirates
Sportspeople from Užice
Association football defenders